Limerstone is a hamlet on the Isle of Wight in England. It is located on the B3399 road between Brighstone (where the 2011Census population was listed) and Shorwell, approximately 5 miles (8km) southwest of Newport. Public transport is provided by Southern Vectis buses on route 12. The hamlet features around 25 houses and a farm, called Limerstone Farm.

Hamlets on the Isle of Wight
Brighstone